Reina del Mar was a  liner which was built by Harland and Wolff in 1955 for Pacific Steam Navigation Company (PSNC). It operated as a passenger liner from the United Kingdom to the western coast of South American until the early 1960s. The Reina del Mar was then a cruise liner that operated out of Southampton during the summer months and out of South Africa during the winter months. It was scrapped in 1975.

Description

History

Passenger liner

Launched on June 7, 1955, it offered modern amenities, like private plumbing in passenger cabins and air-conditioning throughout the ship. It was designed to carry freight and passengers, with first, cabin and tourist class accommodations. A perspex statue of Aphrodite, Birth of Aphrodite, which was carved by Arthur Fleischmann stood in the Embarcation Hall.

Pacific Steam operated it as a liner between the United Kingdom and the west coast of South America, making stops at ports in France, Spain, the Caribbean, through the Panama Canal, and along the western coast of South America. Some passengers were on the ship from one port to another, which may have been as few as a day or two, while others traveled several weeks for the entire trip between Liverpool to Valparaíso, Chile.

Due to the advent of international travel by jet aircraft about 1960, fewer passengers traveled extended distances by passenger liner.

Cruise ship
It operated as a cruise ship—carrying up to 1,047 passengers—by Union-Castle Line, who chartered it to the Travel Savings Association (TSA) beginning in 1963. Based in Southampton, the liner travelled to ports in Scandinavia, the Mediterranean, Canary Islands, West Africa between April and October. Chartered service, called "positioning voyages", ran the other months to South Africa, and then to ports in the Indian Ocean, and South America.

Union-Castle purchased the ship outright in 1973. As was the case for many of the older liners, its business suffered due to the oil crisis of 1973–1974, and it was retired in April 1975 and sold that year to Tung Cheng Steel of Taiwan. It was then scrapped.

References

1955 ships
Ships built by Harland and Wolff
Ships built in Belfast
Ships of Ireland
Ocean liners
Passenger ships of the United Kingdom
Ships of the Pacific Steam Navigation Company
Cargo liners
Steamships of the United Kingdom
Merchant ships of the United Kingdom